The 46th United States Congress was a meeting of the legislative branch of the United States federal government, consisting of the United States Senate and the United States House of Representatives. It met in Washington, D.C. from March 4, 1879, to March 4, 1881, during the last two years of Rutherford Hayes's presidency.

The apportionment of seats in this House of Representatives was based on the 1870 United States census. The Senate had a Democratic majority, while the House of Representatives had a Democratic plurality.  The Democrats were still able to control the House, however, with the help of the Independent politicians who caucused with them.

Party summary

Senate

House of Representatives

Leadership

Senate 
 President: William A. Wheeler (R)
 President pro tempore: Allen G. Thurman (D)
 Democratic Caucus Chairman: William A. Wallace
 Republican Conference Chairman: Henry B. Anthony

House of Representatives 
 Speaker: Samuel J. Randall (D)
 Democratic Caucus Chairman: John Ford House
 Republican Conference Chairman: William P. Frye

Major events

 Depression of 1873–79
 March 18, 1879: Samuel J. Randall was elected in one of the most tightly fought contests for the speakership after the Civil War. Randall, who favored the protective tariff and "hard money," drew his greatest strength from northern cities and greatest opposition from the west and south.  The midterm elections of 1878 had gone badly for the Democrats, with the Greenback Party making inroads in key districts.  This emboldened Randall's opponents, who rallied to the support of Joseph Blackburn from Kentucky.  In the end, Randall prevailed in the Democratic caucus to receive the nomination, with 75 votes to Blackburn's 57 and a scattering of 9 votes to three other candidates.  Blackburn, in moving to make Randall's nomination unanimous, steered his supporters away from the nomination of Hendrick B. Wright, a Democrat from Pennsylvania who was nominated by the Greenbacks.  In the eventual vote in the House to elect the Speaker, Randall prevailed with 144 votes, to 125 for James Garfield (Republican from Ohio), 13 for Wright, and one for William "Pig Iron" Kelley (Pennsylvania).
 November 2, 1880: U.S. presidential election, 1880: James Garfield (R) defeated Winfield S. Hancock (D)
 February 19, 1881: Kansas became the first state to prohibit alcohol.

Major legislation

Members
This list is arranged by chamber, then by state. Senators are listed by class, and representatives are listed by district.

Skip to House of Representatives, below

Senate
Preceding the names in the list below are Senate class numbers, which indicate the cycle of their election. In this Congress, Class 1 meant their term ended with this Congress, requiring re-election in 1880; Class 2 meant their term began in the last Congress, requiring re-election in 1882; and Class 3 meant their term began in this Congress, requiring re-election in 1884.

Alabama 
 2. John Morgan (D)
 3. George S. Houston (D), until December 31, 1879
 Luke Pryor (D), January 7, 1880 - November 23, 1880
 James L. Pugh (D), from November 24, 1880

Arkansas 
 2. Augustus Garland (D)
 3. James D. Walker (D)

California 
 1. Newton Booth (AM)
 3. James T. Farley (D)

Colorado 
 2. Henry Teller (R)
 3. Nathaniel P. Hill (R)

Connecticut 
 1. William W. Eaton (D)
 3. Orville H. Platt (R)

Delaware 
 1. Thomas Bayard Sr. (D)
 2. Eli M. Saulsbury (D)

Florida 
 1. Charles W. Jones (D)
 3. Wilkinson Call (D)

Georgia 
 2. Benjamin Hill (D)
 3. John Gordon (D), until May 26, 1880
 Joseph E. Brown (D), from May 26, 1880

Illinois 
 2. David Davis (I)
 3. John A. Logan (R)

Indiana 
 1. Joseph E. McDonald (D)
 3. Daniel W. Voorhees (D)

Iowa 
 2. Samuel J. Kirkwood (R)
 3. William B. Allison (R)

Kansas 
 2. Preston B. Plumb (R)
 3. John Ingalls (R)

Kentucky 
 2. James B. Beck (D)
 3. John Williams (D)

Louisiana 
 2. William Pitt Kellogg (R)
 3. Benjamin F. Jonas (D)

Maine 
 1. Hannibal Hamlin (R)
 2. James G. Blaine (R)

Maryland 
 1. William Pinkney Whyte (D)
 3. James Groome (D)

Massachusetts 
 1. Henry L. Dawes (R)
 2. George Hoar (R)

Michigan 
 1. Zachariah Chandler (R), until November 1, 1879
 Henry P. Baldwin (R), from November 17, 1879
 2. Thomas W. Ferry (R)

Minnesota 
 1. Samuel McMillan (R)
 2. William Windom (R)

Mississippi 
 1. Blanche Bruce (R)
 2. Lucius Lamar (D)

Missouri 
 1. Francis Cockrell (D)
 3. George Vest (D)

Nebraska 
 1. Algernon Paddock (R)
 2. Alvin Saunders (R)

Nevada 
 1. William Sharon (R)
 3. John P. Jones (R)

New Hampshire 
 2. Edward H. Rollins (R)
 3. Charles Bell (R), March 13, 1879 - June 18, 1879
 Henry W. Blair (R), from June 18, 1879

New Jersey 
 1. Theodore Randolph (D)
 2. John R. McPherson (D)

New York 
 1. Francis Kernan (D)
 3. Roscoe Conkling (R)

North Carolina 
 2. Matt Ransom (D)
 3. Zebulon Vance (D)

Ohio 
 1. Allen G. Thurman (D)
 3. George H. Pendleton (D)

Oregon 
 2. La Fayette Grover (D)
 3. James H. Slater (D)

Pennsylvania 
 1. William A. Wallace (D)
 3. J. Donald Cameron (R)

Rhode Island 
 1. Ambrose Burnside (R)
 2. Henry B. Anthony (R)

South Carolina 
 2. Matthew Butler (D)
 3. Wade Hampton III (D)

Tennessee 
 1. James E. Bailey (D)
 2. Isham G. Harris (D)

Texas 
 1. Samuel B. Maxey (D)
 2. Richard Coke (D)

Vermont 
 1. George F. Edmunds (R)
 3. Justin Morrill (R)

Virginia 
 1. Robert E. Withers (D)
 2. John W. Johnston (D)

West Virginia 
 1. Frank Hereford (D)
 2. Henry G. Davis (D)

Wisconsin 
 1. Angus Cameron (R)
 3. Matthew H. Carpenter (R), until February 24, 1881

House of Representatives
The names of members are preceded by their district numbers.

Alabama 
 . Thomas H. Herndon (D)
 . Hilary A. Herbert (D)
 . William J. Samford (D)
 . Charles M. Shelley (D)
 . Thomas Williams (D)
 . Burwell Lewis (D), until October 1, 1880
 Newton N. Clements (D), from December 8, 1880
 . William H. Forney (D)
 . William M. Lowe (GB)

Arkansas 
 . Poindexter Dunn (D)
 . William F. Slemons (D)
 . Jordan E. Cravens (D)
 . Thomas M. Gunter (D)

California 
 . Horace Davis (R)
 . Horace F. Page (R)
 . Campbell P. Berry (D)
 . Romualdo Pacheco (R)

Colorado 
 . James B. Belford (R)

Connecticut 
 . Joseph R. Hawley (R)
 . James Phelps (D)
 . John T. Wait (R)
 . Frederick Miles (R)

Delaware 
 . Edward L. Martin (D)

Florida 
 . Robert H. M. Davidson (D)
 . Noble A. Hull (D), until January 22, 1881
 Horatio Bisbee Jr. (R), from January 22, 1881

Georgia 
 . John C. Nicholls (D)
 . William E. Smith (D)
 . Philip Cook (D)
 . Henry Persons (ID)
 . Nathaniel J. Hammond (D)
 . James Blount (D)
 . William Felton (D)
 . Alexander H. Stephens (D)
 . Emory Speer (ID)

Illinois 
 . William Aldrich (R)
 . George R. Davis (R)
 . Hiram Barber Jr. (R)
 . John C. Sherwin (R)
 . Robert M. A. Hawk (R)
 . Thomas J. Henderson (R)
 . Philip C. Hayes (R)
 . Greenbury L. Fort (R)
 . Thomas A. Boyd (R)
 . Benjamin F. Marsh (R)
 . James W. Singleton (D)
 . William M. Springer (D)
 . Adlai E. Stevenson (D)
 . Joseph G. Cannon (R)
 . Albert P. Forsythe (GB)
 . William A. J. Sparks (D)
 . William R. Morrison (D)
 . John R. Thomas (R)
 . Richard W. Townshend (D)

Indiana 
 . William Heilman (R)
 . Thomas R. Cobb (D)
 . George A. Bicknell (D)
 . Jeptha D. New (D)
 . Thomas M. Browne (R)
 . William R. Myers (D)
 . Gilbert De La Matyr (GB)
 . Abraham J. Hostetler (D)
 . Godlove S. Orth (R)
 . William H. Calkins (R)
 . Calvin Cowgill (R)
 . Walpole G. Colerick (D)
 . John Baker (R)

Iowa 
 . Moses A. McCoid (R)
 . Hiram Price (R)
 . Thomas Updegraff (R)
 . Nathaniel C. Deering (R)
 . Rush Clark (R), until April 29, 1879
 William G. Thompson (R), from December 1, 1879
 . James B. Weaver (GB)
 . Edward H. Gillette (GB)
 . William F. Sapp (R)
 . Cyrus C. Carpenter (R)

Kansas 
 . John A. Anderson (R)
 . Dudley C. Haskell (R)
 . Thomas Ryan (R)

Kentucky 
 . Oscar Turner (ID)
 . James A. McKenzie (D)
 . John William Caldwell (D)
 . J. Proctor Knott (D)
 . Albert S. Willis (D)
 . John G. Carlisle (D)
 . Joseph C. S. Blackburn (D)
 . Philip B. Thompson Jr. (D)
 . Thomas Turner (D)
 . Elijah C. Phister (D)

Louisiana 
 . Randall L. Gibson (D)
 . E. John Ellis (D)
 . Joseph H. Acklen (D)
 . Joseph B. Elam (D)
 . J. Floyd King (D)
 . Edward W. Robertson (D)

Maine 
 . Thomas B. Reed (R)
 . William P. Frye (R)
 . Stephen D. Lindsey (R)
 . George W. Ladd (GB)
 . Thompson H. Murch (GB)

Maryland 
 . Daniel M. Henry (D)
 . J. Frederick C. Talbott (D)
 . William Kimmel (D)
 . Robert M. McLane (D)
 . Eli J. Henkle (D)
 . Milton G. Urner (R)

Massachusetts 
 . William W. Crapo (R)
 . Benjamin W. Harris (R)
 . Walbridge A. Field (R)
 . Leopold Morse (D)
 . Selwyn Z. Bowman (R)
 . George B. Loring (R)
 . William A. Russell (R)
 . William Claflin (R)
 . William W. Rice (R)
 . Amasa Norcross (R)
 . George D. Robinson (R)

Michigan 
 . John Newberry (R)
 . Edwin Willits (R)
 . Jonas H. McGowan (R)
 . Julius C. Burrows (R)
 . John W. Stone (R)
 . Mark S. Brewer (R)
 . Omar D. Conger (R), until March 3, 1881
 . Roswell G. Horr (R)
 . Jay Hubbell (R)

Minnesota 
 . Mark H. Dunnell (R)
 . Henry Poehler (D)
 . William D. Washburn (R)

Mississippi 
 . Henry L. Muldrow (D)
 . Vannoy Manning (D)
 . Hernando Money (D)
 . Otho R. Singleton (D)
 . Charles E. Hooker (D)
 . James Chalmers (D)

Missouri 
 . Martin L. Clardy (D)
 . Erastus Wells (D)
 . Richard G. Frost (D)
 . Lowndes H. Davis (D)
 . Richard P. Bland (D)
 . James R. Waddill (D)
 . Alfred M. Lay (D), until December 8, 1879
 John F. Philips (D), from January 10, 1880
 . Samuel L. Sawyer (ID)
 . Nicholas Ford (GB)
 . Gideon F. Rothwell (D)
 . John B. Clark Jr. (D)
 . William H. Hatch (D)
 . Aylett H. Buckner (D)

Nebraska 
 . Edward K. Valentine (R)

Nevada 
 . Rollin M. Daggett (R)

New Hampshire 
 . Joshua G. Hall (R)
 . James F. Briggs (R)
 . Evarts Farr (R), until November 30, 1880
 Ossian Ray (R), from January 8, 1881

New Jersey 
 . George M. Robeson (R)
 . Hezekiah Smith (D)
 . Miles Ross (D)
 . Alvah A. Clark (D)
 . Charles H. Voorhis (R)
 . John L. Blake (R)
 . Lewis A. Brigham (R)

New York 
 . James W. Covert (D)
 . Daniel O'Reilly (ID)
 . Simeon B. Chittenden (R)
 . Archibald M. Bliss (D)
 . Nicholas Muller (D)
 . Samuel S. Cox (D)
 . Edwin Einstein (R)
 . Anson G. McCook (R)
 . Fernando Wood (D), until February 14, 1881
 . James O'Brien (ID)
 . Levi P. Morton (R)
 . Waldo Hutchins (D), from November 4, 1879
 . John H. Ketcham (R)
 . John W. Ferdon (R)
 . William Lounsbery (D)
 . John M. Bailey (R)
 . Walter A. Wood (R)
 . John Hammond (R)
 . Amaziah B. James (R)
 . John H. Starin (R)
 . David Wilber (R)
 . Warner Miller (R)
 . Cyrus D. Prescott (R)
 . Joseph Mason (R)
 . Frank Hiscock (R)
 . John H. Camp (R)
 . Elbridge G. Lapham (R)
 . Jeremiah W. Dwight (R)
 . David P. Richardson (R)
 . John Van Voorhis (R)
 . Richard Crowley (R)
 . Ray V. Pierce (R), until September 18, 1880
 Jonathan Scoville (D), from November 12, 1880
 . Henry H. Van Aernam (R)

North Carolina 
 . Joseph Martin (R), until January 29, 1881
 Jesse J. Yeates (D), from January 29, 1881
 . William H. Kitchin (D)
 . Daniel Russell (GB)
 . Joseph J. Davis (D)
 . Alfred M. Scales (D)
 . Walter L. Steele (D)
 . Robert F. Armfield (D)
 . Robert B. Vance (D)

Ohio 
 . Benjamin Butterworth (R)
 . Thomas L. Young (R)
 . John A. McMahon (D)
 . J. Warren Keifer (R)
 . Benjamin Le Fevre (D)
 . William D. Hill (D)
 . Frank H. Hurd (D)
 . Ebenezer B. Finley (D)
 . George L. Converse (D)
 . Thomas Ewing Jr. (D)
 . Henry L. Dickey (D)
 . Henry S. Neal (R)
 . Adoniram J. Warner (D)
 . Gibson Atherton (D)
 . George W. Geddes (D)
 . William McKinley (R)
 . James Monroe (R)
 . Jonathan T. Updegraff (R)
 . James A. Garfield (R), until November 8, 1880
 Ezra B. Taylor (R), from December 13, 1880
 . Amos Townsend (R)

Oregon 
 . John Whiteaker (D)

Pennsylvania 
 . Henry H. Bingham (R)
 . Charles O'Neill (R)
 . Samuel J. Randall (D)
 . William D. Kelley (R)
 . Alfred C. Harmer (R)
 . William Ward (R)
 . William Godshalk (R)
 . Hiester Clymer (D)
 . A. Herr Smith (R)
 . Reuben Bachman (D)
 . Robert Klotz (D)
 . Hendrick B. Wright (GB)
 . John Ryon (D)
 . John W. Killinger (R)
 . Edward Overton Jr. (R)
 . John I. Mitchell (R)
 . Alexander H. Coffroth (D)
 . Horatio G. Fisher (R)
 . Frank E. Beltzhoover (D)
 . Seth Yocum (GB)
 . Morgan R. Wise (D)
 . Russell Errett (R)
 . Thomas M. Bayne (R)
 . William S. Shallenberger (R)
 . Harry White (R)
 . Samuel Dick (R)
 . James H. Osmer (R)

Rhode Island 
 . Nelson W. Aldrich (R)
 . Latimer W. Ballou (R)

South Carolina 
 . John S. Richardson (D)
 . Michael P. O'Connor (D)
 . D. Wyatt Aiken (D)
 . John H. Evins (D)
 . George D. Tillman (D)

Tennessee 
 . Robert Taylor (D)
 . Leonidas C. Houk (R)
 . George G. Dibrell (D)
 . Benton McMillin (D)
 . John M. Bright (D)
 . John F. House (D)
 . Washington C. Whitthorne (D)
 . John D. C. Atkins (D)
 . Charles B. Simonton (D)
 . H. Casey Young (D)

Texas 
 . John H. Reagan (D)
 . David B. Culberson (D)
 . Olin Wellborn (D)
 . Roger Q. Mills (D)
 . George W. Jones (GB)
 . Christopher C. Upson (D), from April 15, 1879

Vermont 
 . Charles H. Joyce (R)
 . James M. Tyler (R)
 . Bradley Barlow (GB)

Virginia 
 . Richard Lee T. Beale (D)
 . John Goode Jr. (D)
 . Joseph E. Johnston (D)
 . Joseph Jorgensen (R)
 . George Cabell (D)
 . John R. Tucker (D)
 . John T. Harris (D)
 . Eppa Hutton II (D)
 . James Richmond (D)

West Virginia 
 . Benjamin Wilson (D)
 . Benjamin F. Martin (D)
 . John E. Kenna (D)

Wisconsin 
 . Charles G. Williams (R)
 . Lucien B. Caswell (R)
 . George Hazelton (R)
 . Peter V. Deuster (D)
 . Edward S. Bragg (D)
 . Gabriel Bouck (D)
 . Herman L. Humphrey (R)
 . Thaddeus C. Pound (R)

Non-voting delegates 
 . John G. Campbell (D)
 . Granville G. Bennett (R)
 . George Ainslie (D)
 . Martin Maginnis (D)
 . Mariano S. Otero (R)
 . George Q. Cannon (R)
 . Thomas H. Brents (R)
 . Stephen Downey (R)

Changes in membership
The count below reflects changes from the beginning of the first session of this Congress.

Senate 
 Replacements: 4
 Democratic: no net change
 Republican: no net change
 Deaths: 3
 Resignations: 1
 Interim appointments: 2
Total seats with changes: 5

|-
| New Hampshire (3)
| Vacant
| Legislature had failed to elect.An interim successor was appointed March 13, 1879.
| nowrap  | Charles H. Bell (R)
| March 13, 1879

|-
| New Hampshire (3)
| nowrap  | Charles H. Bell (R)
| Successor elected June 18, 1879, but did not begin service until June 20, 1879, for unknown reasons.
| nowrap  | Henry W. Blair (R)
| June 20, 1879

|-
| Michigan (1)
| nowrap  | Zachariah Chandler (R)
| Died November 1, 1879.Successor appointed November 17, 1879, to continue the term.Appointee was elected January 19, 1881, to finish the term.
| nowrap  | Henry P. Baldwin (R)
| November 17, 1879

|-
| Alabama (3)
| nowrap  | George S. Houston (D)
| Died December 31, 1879.Successor appointed January 7, 1880, to continue the term.
| nowrap  | Luke Pryor (D)
| January 7, 1880

|-
| Georgia (3)
| nowrap  | John B. Gordon (D)
| Resigned May 26, 1880, to promote building of the Georgia Pacific Railway.Successor elected May 26, 1880.
| nowrap  | Joseph E. Brown (D)
| May 26, 1880

|-
| Alabama (3)
| nowrap  | Luke Pryor (D)
| Successor elected November 23, 1880.
| nowrap  | James L. Pugh (D)
| November 24, 1880

|-
| Wisconsin (3)
| nowrap  | Matthew H. Carpenter (R)
| Died February 24, 1881.
| Vacant
| Not filled this term

|}

House of Representatives 
 Replacements: 8
 Democratic: 1 seat net gain
 Republican: 1 seat net loss
 Deaths: 4
 Resignations: 3
 Contested election: 2
Total seats with changes: 11

|-
| 
| Vacant
| Rep. Gustav Schleicher died during previous congress
| nowrap  | Christopher C. Upson (D)
| April 15, 1879

|-
| 
| Vacant
| Rep.-elect Alexander Smith died during previous congress
| nowrap  | Waldo Hutchins (D)
| November 4, 1879

|-
| 
| nowrap  | Rush Clark (R)
| Died April 29, 1879
| nowrap  | William G. Thompson (R)
| October 14, 1879

|-
| 
| nowrap  | Alfred M. Lay (D)
| Died December 8, 1879
| nowrap  | John F. Philips (D)
| January 10, 1880

|-
| 
| nowrap  | Ray V. Pierce (R)
| Resigned September 18, 1880
| nowrap  | Jonathan Scoville (D)
| November 12, 1880

|-
| 
| nowrap  | Burwell B. Lewis (D)
| Resigned October 1, 1880, to accept presidency of the University of Alabama
| nowrap  | Newton N. Clements (D)
| December 8, 1880

|-
| 
| nowrap  | James A. Garfield (R)
| Resigned November 8, 1880
| nowrap  | Ezra B. Taylor (R)
| December 13, 1880

|-
| 
| nowrap  | Evarts W. Farr (R)
| Died November 30, 1880.Successor elected December 28, 1880.
| nowrap  | Ossian Ray (R)
| January 8, 1881

|-
| 
| nowrap  | Noble A. Hull (D)
| Lost contested election January 22, 1881
| nowrap  | Horatio Bisbee Jr. (R)
| January 22, 1881

|-
| 
| nowrap  | Joseph J. Martin (R)
| Lost contested election January 29, 1881
| nowrap  | Jesse J. Yeates (D)
| January 29, 1881

|-
| 
| nowrap  | Fernando Wood (D)
| Died February 14, 1881
| Vacant
| Not filled this term

|-
| 
| nowrap  | Omar D. Conger (R)
| Resigned March 3, 1881, after being elected to the US Senate
| Vacant
| Not filled this term

|}

Committees

Senate

 Additional Accommodations for the Library of Congress (Select)
 Agriculture (Chairman: John W. Johnston; Ranking Member: Algernon S. Paddock)
 Appropriations (Chairman: Henry G. Davis; Ranking Member: William Windom)
 Audit and Control the Contingent Expenses of the Senate (Chairman: Benjamin H. Hill; Ranking Member: John P. Jones)
 Cabinet Officers on the Floor of the Senate (Select)
 Civil Service and Retrenchment (Chairman: Matthew C. Butler; Ranking Member: Henry M. Teller)
 Claims (Chairman: Francis M. Cockrell; Ranking Member: Samuel J.R. McMillan)
 Commerce (Chairman: Matt W. Ransom; Ranking Member: Roscoe Conkling)
 Distributing Public Revenue Among the States (Select)
 District of Columbia (Chairman: Isham G. Harris; Ranking Member: John J. Ingalls)
 Education and Labor (Chairman: James E. Bailey; Ranking Member: Ambrose E. Burnside)
 Elections of 1878 (Select)
 Emigration of Negroes from the South to North (Select)
 Engrossed Bills (Chairman: Roscoe Conkling; Ranking Member: Robert E. Withers)
 Enrolled Bills (Chairman: Zebulon B. Vance; Ranking Member: Edward H. Rollins)
 Epidemic Diseases (Select) (Chairman: Isham G. Harris; Ranking Member: Algernon S. Paddock)
 Examine the Several Branches in the Civil Service (Chairman: George G. Vest; Ranking Member: John A. Logan)
 Finance (Chairman: Thomas F. Bayard; Ranking Member: Justin S. Morrill)
 Foreign Relations (Chairman: William W. Eaton; Ranking Member: Hannibal Hamlin)
 Freedman's Savings and Trust Company (Select)
 Indian Affairs (Chairman: Richard Coke; Ranking Member: William B. Allison)
 Indian Territory (Select)
 Judiciary (Chairman: Allen G. Thurman; Ranking Member: David Davis)
 Manufactures (Chairman: La Fayette Grover; Ranking Member: Edward H. Rollins)
 Military Affairs (Chairman: Theodore F. Randolph; Ranking Member: Ambrose E. Burnside)
 Mines and Mining (Chairman: Frank Hereford; Ranking Member: J. Donald Cameron)
 Mississippi River and its Tributaries (Select) (Chairman: Benjamin F. Jonas; Ranking Member: James G. Blaine)
 Naval Affairs (Chairman: John R. McPherson; Ranking Member: Henry B. Anthony)
 Nicaraguan Claims (Select)
 Ordnance and War Ships (Select)
 Patents (Chairman: Francis Kernan; Ranking Member: Newton Booth)
 Pensions (Chairman: Robert E. Withers; Ranking Member: John J. Ingalls)
 Plueropneumonia among Animals (Select)
 Post Office and Post Roads (Chairman: Samuel B. Maxey; Ranking Member: James B. Groome)
 Private Land Claims (Chairman: George F. Edmunds; Ranking Member: David Davis)
 Privileges and Elections (Chairman: Eli Saulsbury; Ranking Member: Zebulon B. Vance)
 Public Lands (Chairman: Joseph E. McDonald; Ranking Member: Preston B. Plumb)
 Railroads (Chairman: Lucius Quintus Cincinnatus Lamar II; Ranking Member: Benjamin F. Jonas) 
 Revision of the Laws (Chairman: William A. Wallace; Ranking Member: George F. Hoar)
 Revolutionary Claims (Chairman: Henry B. Anthony; Ranking Member: Charles W. Jones)
 Rules (Chairman: John Tyler Morgan; Ranking Member: James G. Blaine)
 Tariff Regulation (Select)
 Tenth Census (Select) (Chairman: George H. Pendleton; Ranking Member: David Davis)
 Territories (Chairman: Augustus H. Garland; Ranking Member: Alvin Saunders)
 Transportation Routes to the Seaboard (Select) (Chairman: James B. Beck; Ranking Member: J. Donald Cameron)
 Treasury Department Account Discrepancies (Select)
 Whole

House of Representatives

 Accounts (Chairman: Daniel M. Henry; Ranking Member: Thomas A. Boyd)  
 Alcoholic Liquor Traffic (Select) (Chairman: Lowndes H. Davis; Ranking Member: Mark S. Brewer) 
 Agriculture (Chairman: James W. Covert; Ranking Member: William H. Hatch) 
 Appropriations (Chairman: John DeWitt Clinton Atkins; Ranking Member: John A. McMahon)
 Banking and Currency (Chairman: Aylett H. Buckner; Ranking Member: George W. Ladd) 
 Claims (Chairman: John M. Bright; Ranking Member: William J. Samford) 
 Coinage, Weights and Measures (Chairman: Alexander H. Stephens; Ranking Member: Gilbert De La Matyr) 
 Commerce (Chairman: John H. Reagan; Ranking Member: Peter V. Deuster) 
 District of Columbia (Chairman: Eppa Hunton; Ranking Member: William Heilman) 
 Education and Labor (Chairman: John Goode; Ranking Member: James H. Osmer) 
 Elections (Chairman: William M. Springer; Ranking Member: J. Warren Keifer)
 Enrolled Bills (Chairman: John E. Kenna; Ranking Member: David F. Wilber) 
 Expenditures in the Interior Department (Chairman: Nicholas Muller; Ranking Member: Gilbert De La Matyr) 
 Expenditures in the Justice Department (Chairman: James H. Blount; Ranking Member: Lowndes H. Davis) 
 Expenditures in the Navy Department (Chairman: Richard W. Townshend; Ranking Member: Walter A. Wood) 
 Expenditures in the Post Office Department (Chairman: George W. Ladd; Ranking Member: John L. Blake)
 Expenditures in the State Department (Chairman: Hiester Clymer; Ranking Member: John S. Newberry) 
 Expenditures in the Treasury Department (Chairman: William H. Forney; Ranking Member: Charles O'Neill) 
 Expenditures in the War Department (Chairman: Joseph C. S. Blackburn; Ranking Member: Harry White) 
 Expenditures on Public Buildings (Chairman: Peter V. Deuster; Ranking Member: Nicholas Ford) 
 Foreign Affairs (Chairman: Samuel S. Cox; Ranking Member: William D. Hill) 
 Indian Affairs (Chairman: Alfred M. Scales; Ranking Member: Olin Wellborn) 
 Invalid Pensions (Chairman: Alexander H. Coffroth; Ranking Member: Robert L. Taylor)
 Judiciary (Chairman: J. Proctor Knott; Ranking Member: Nathaniel J. Hammond) 
 Levees and Improvements of the Mississippi River (Chairman: Edward W. Robertson; Ranking Member: Thomas M. Bayne) 
 Manufactures (Chairman: Morgan R. Wise; Ranking Member: William M. Lowe) 
 Mileage (Chairman: Thomas R. Cobb; Ranking Member: Simeon B. Chittenden) 
 Military Affairs (Chairman: William A.J. Sparks; Ranking Member: Harry White) 
 Militia (Chairman: Miles Ross; Ranking Member: Samuel B. Dick) 
 Mines and Mining (Chairman: Adlai E. Stevenson; Ranking Member: John I. Mitchell) 
 Naval Affairs (Chairman: Washington C. Whitthorne; Ranking Member: James O'Brien) 
 Pacific Railroads (Chairman: Robert Milligan McLane; Ranking Member: Olin Wellborn) 
 Patents (Chairman: Robert B. Vance; Ranking Member: Hezekiah B. Smith) 
 Pensions (Chairman: John Whiteaker; Ranking Member: N/A) 
 Post Office and Post Roads (Chairman: Hernando D. Money; Ranking Member: George Washington Jones) 
 Private Land Claims (Chairman: Thomas M. Gunter; Ranking Member: John I. Mitchell)
 Public Buildings and Grounds (Chairman: Philip Cook; Ranking Member: Thompson H. Murch) 
 Public Expenditures (Chairman: Ebenezer B. Finley; Ranking Member: Charles H. Joyce) 
 Public Lands (Chairman: George L. Converse; Ranking Member: Thomas Ryan) 
 Railways and Canals (Chairman: George C. Cabell; Ranking Member: Daniel O'Reilly) 
 Revision of Laws (Chairman: John T. Harris; Ranking Member: William M. Lowe)
 Revolutionary Pensions (Chairman: John Whiteaker; Ranking Member: George L. Converse)
 Rules (Select) (Chairman: Samuel J. Randall; Ranking Member: James A. Garfield) 
 Standards of Official Conduct
 Territories (Chairman: Henry L. Muldrow; Ranking Member: Reuben K. Bachman) 
 War Claims (Chairman: Edward S. Bragg; Ranking Member: Cyrus C. Carpenter) 
 Ways and Means (Chairman: Fernando Wood; Ranking Member: William H. Felton)
 Whole

Joint committees

 Budget Control
 Conditions of Indian Tribes (Special)
 Census (Chairman: Rep. Samuel S. Cox; Vice Chairman: Rep. Gideon F. Rothwell)
 Enrolled Bills (Chairman: Rep. John E. Kenna; Vice Chairman: Rep. David F. Wilber)
 The Library (Chairman: Rep. George W. Geddes; Vice Chairman: Rep. William Claflin)
 Printing (Chairman: Rep. Otho R. Singleton; Vice Chairman: Rep. Philip C. Hayes)

Caucuses
 Democratic (House)
 Democratic (Senate)

Employees

Legislative branch agency directors
 Architect of the Capitol: Edward Clark
 Librarian of Congress: Ainsworth Rand Spofford 
 Public Printer of the United States: John D. Defrees

Senate
 Secretary: George C. Gorham, until March 24, 1879
 John C. Burch elected March 24, 1879
 Librarian: P. J. Pierce
 Sergeant at Arms: John R. French, until March 23, 1879
 Richard J. Bright, elected March 23, 1879
 Chaplain: Byron Sunderland (Presbyterian), until March 24, 1879
 Joseph J. Bullock (Presbyterian), elected March 24, 1879

House of Representatives
 Clerk: George M. Adams
 Sergeant at Arms: John G. Thompson
 Doorkeeper: Charles W. Field
 Postmaster: James M. Steuart
 Clerk at the Speaker's Table: J. Randolph Tucker Jr.
 George P. Miller
 Michael Sullivan
 Reading Clerks: 
 Thomas S. Pettit (D) 
 Neill S. Brown Jr. (R)
 Chaplain: W.P. Harrison (Methodist)

See also 
 1878 United States elections (elections leading to this Congress)
 1878–79 United States Senate elections
 1878–79 United States House of Representatives elections
 1880 United States elections (elections during this Congress, leading to the next Congress)
 1880 United States presidential election
 1880–81 United States Senate elections
 1880 United States House of Representatives elections

Notes

References

External links
Biographical Directory of the U.S. Congress
U.S. House of Representatives: House History
U.S. Senate: Statistics and Lists